Nathan Lee "Nate" Higgs (born October 21, 1970) is an American/Spanish basketball player and coach.

Personal information
Higgs is 6'7" tall.

Graduated from Tarboro High School in Tarboro, N.C.

College
Higgs played for the Elizabeth City State University (ECSU) Vikings basketball team in the Central Intercollegiate Athletic Association (CIAA).  In 1992, 1993, and 1994 he was named to the all-conference team, and in 1993 he was named CIAA Player of the Year in 1993, and captained the all-conference team.

Professional

In October 1994, Higgs passed over offers from Charlotte, Milwaukee and Miami and signed with the Seattle SuperSonics basketball team as a forward-centre.  According to Higgs' agent, Seattle represented "the best basketball opportunity" and "the best economic deal".

Higgs went on to play in the CBA, being the second overall pick in the first round for the Omaha Racers.
1995 – signed as a free agent with the Vancouver (Memphis) Grizzlies and was again the last cut. From there, he played with the Yakima Sun Kings again in the CBA.
1996 – began European career with Uppsala Gators in Sweden where he went on to make a name for himself.
1997–98 – Played with Indepediente Argentina (Teammate of Andreas "Chapu" Nocioni Sacramento Kings NBA) and finished 3 in the South America Cup finalist, losing to Oscar Schmidt with Franco in Brazil.
1999–2000 – Won the Spanish ACB Slamdunk contest while averaging 13 points and 6 rebounds per contest in.

He has played in Italy, Greece, Israel, Argentina, France, Venezuela, Puerto Rico, Lebanon and a total of over 20 countries worldwide. Currently is still active in the European and Spanish leagues. Possesses dual citizenship. He was inducted in his university's Sports Hall of Fame at Elizabeth City State University October 16, 2009.

References

External links
Spanish League profile
 Official Website of Nate Higgs (in Spanish)

1970 births
Living people
Basketball players from North Carolina
Bàsquet Manresa players
Bnei Hertzeliya basketball players
Elizabeth City State Vikings basketball players
Israeli Basketball Premier League players
Liga ACB players
Maccabi Rishon LeZion basketball players
Omaha Racers players
People from Tarboro, North Carolina
Yakima Sun Kings players
American men's basketball players